Châtenois is a commune in the Bas-Rhin department in Alsace in north-eastern France.

The small town is notable for its architectural heritage, among which the church Église Saint-Georges, the medieval, timber-framed "witch tower" (Tour des sorcières), the ancient town hall, etc.

See also
 Communes of the Bas-Rhin department
 Château et cimetière de Châtenois

References

Communes of Bas-Rhin
Bas-Rhin communes articles needing translation from French Wikipedia